Ankyrin repeat domain-containing protein 27 is a protein that in humans is encoded by the ANKRD27 gene.

References

External links

Further reading